Abdul Kamara is the United Nations Joint Special Representative in Darfur.

Biographical Information
Prior to this appointment of 25 September 2014 by United Nations Secretary-General Ban Ki-moon, Mr. Kamara held several high-level positions in the African Development Bank. He served as Resident Representative in the Sudan Country Office, Manager of the Research Division and Senior Agricultural Economist. Before joining the African Development Bank, Mr. Kamara held the position of Research Scientist at the International Water Management Institute in South Africa, .

Education
Mr. Kamara graduated from the Georg-August University of Göttingen in Germany with a PH.D. in Agricultural Economics.

References

External links

Sierra Leonean officials of the United Nations
Living people
Year of birth missing (living people)